Ünnaste  is a village in Põhja-Pärnumaa Parish, Pärnu County in western-central Estonia.

References

Villages in Pärnu County